In 1937, during the Spanish Civil War, Italians from the Corpo Truppe Volontarie began to serve in mixed Italo-Spanish Flechas (Arrows) units where the Italians provided the officers and technical personnel, while the Spanish served in the rank-and-file. One, the Flechas Azules Mixed Brigade "Blue Arrows" first served in Extremadura from April 1937 to the end of the War in the North.

Order of Battle, April 1937 

Flechas Azules Brigade - Col. Mario Guassardo 
 1st Regimient 
 1st Battalion
 2nd Battalion
 3rd Battalion
 2nd Regimient 
 1st Battalion
 2nd Battalion
 3rd Battalion 
 Assault Battalion 
 1st Company
 2nd Company
 Artillery Group
 X Group 75/27 
 Battery 20mm AA

Order of Battle, Aragon Front 1938 

Flechas Azules Brigade - Col. Mario Guassardo  
 3rd Regimient 
 1st Battalion
 2nd Battalion
 3rd Battalion
 Battery 65/17 
 4th Regimient 
 1st Battalion
 2nd Battalion
 3rd Battalion 
 Battery 65/17 
 Assault Battalion "As" 
 Artillery Group
 Xº Group de 75/27 
 Bía de 20mm 
 Bía de 37mm 
 Engineer Company
 Military Police Section  
 Intendencia Section 
 Sanitation Section
 Division Truck Unit

The Flechas Azules Brigade was later used to form the Flechas Verdes Division and Flechas Azules Division in late 1938.

See also 
 Flechas Negras Mixed Brigade

Sources 
de Mesa, José Luis, El regreso de las legiones: (la ayuda militar italiana a la España nacional, 1936-1939),  García Hispán, Granada:España, 1994 

Military units and formations of the Spanish Civil War
Military units and formations of Italy in the Spanish Civil War